Darazo is a Local Government Area of Bauchi State, Nigeria,  Its headquarters are in the town of Darazo. Darazo is mainly dominated by Fulani people.

It has an area of 3,015 km and a population of 251,597 at the 2006 census.

The postal code of the area is 750.

The Zumbun language is spoken in Jimbim settlement in Darazo LGA.

References

Local Government Areas in Bauchi State